The Christian Alliance Party is a political party in the Solomon Islands. At the 2006 Solomon Islands general election, the party received 3,613 votes (1.9% of the total) and won no seats.

It did not contest the 2014 general election.

References

Christian political parties
Political parties in the Solomon Islands